Don L. Talley (December 12, 1918 – September 23, 1982) was an American politician in the state of Washington. He served in the Washington State Senate from 1957 to 1982. He died of a heart attack in 1982.

References

1918 births
1982 deaths
Democratic Party Washington (state) state senators
20th-century American politicians